The 2015 TCU Horned Frogs baseball team represented Texas Christian University during the 2015 NCAA Division I baseball season. The Horned Frogs played their home games at Lupton Stadium as a member of the Big 12 Conference. They were led by head coach Jim Schlossnagle, in his 12th year at TCU.

Previous season
The 2014 Horned Frogs earned a 38–15 (17–7) regular season record and finished second in the Big 12 Conference behind regular season champion Oklahoma State. They qualified for the 2014 Big 12 Conference baseball tournament and defeated Oklahoma State 7–1 in the tournament final for TCU's first-ever Big 12 Championship. The championship earned the Frogs the Big 12's automatic bid to the 2014 NCAA Division I baseball tournament. The Horned Frogs were selected as the #7 national seed, the first-ever national seed earned in program history.

The #7 national seed Horned Frogs hosted the Fort Worth Regional, which also included Dallas Baptist, Sam Houston State, and Siena. TCU opened NCAA Tournament play with two extra innings victories: first, a 2–1 victory over Siena in 11 innings, and second, a 3–2 victory over Sam Houston State in 22 innings. In the regional final, the Horned Frogs defeated Sam Houston State, 6–1, to advance to the Fort Worth Super Regional, hosting the Pepperdine Waves. The 2014 Fort Worth Super Regional was the first Super Regional ever hosted by TCU. The Horned Frogs prevailed over the Pepperdine Waves in game one with a 3–2 victory, but fell in game two by a score of 2–3. The Frogs and Waves played a third and final game, a game the Frogs won 6–5, earning TCU a berth to the College World Series in Omaha, Nebraska. The 2014 College World Series berth was the second in school history. In the College World Series, the Horned Frogs first faced Big 12 foe Texas Tech. TCU defeated the Red Raiders 3–2 but went on to lose their second CWS game to Virginia 2–3 in 15 innings. In their third game, the Frogs fell to Ole Miss, 4–6, and were eliminated from the NCAA tournament. The Horned Frogs finished the 2014 season ranked #5 in both the Coaches' Poll and CBN Poll.

Regular season
Coming off the program's second College World Series appearance in 2014, TCU entered the 2015 season ranked as high as #2 in preseason polls. The Horned Frogs opened the 2015 season with a 7–1 record in the month of February, including a series win at #9-ranked Arizona State, that pushed the Frogs as high as #1 in the polls. TCU opened the month of March with a home win over the #16 Rice Owls, then traveled to Los Angeles to compete in the 2015 Dodgertown Classic, where the Horned Frogs notched a win at #7 UCLA and knocked off the defending national champion Vanderbilt Commodores at Dodger Stadium. The Frogs compiled a record of 14–4 in the month of March, losing only one series to conference foe and defending Big 12 regular season champion Oklahoma State.

TCU entered the month of April with an overall record of 21–5 (4–2 Big 12). The Frogs notched a 13–4 record in the month of April to run their overall record to 34–9 (10–5 Big 12). The team's only losses came on the road, where they dropped a series at Kansas State, a single game at Texas Tech, and a mid-week tilt at Dallas Baptist. The Horned Frogs were undefeated at home in April, including series sweeps of Santa Clara and Texas. TCU's sweep of Texas ran the Frogs' all-time Big 12 record versus the Longhorns to 8–1.

The Frogs responded to the late-April loss by piling up 9 wins in a row to complete the regular season, On May 6, 2015, the Horned Frogs clinched their first-ever outright Big 12 Regular Season Baseball Championship and secured the #1 seed in the 2015 Big 12 Baseball Tournament by winning a 5–4 thriller at Oklahoma. TCU concluded the regular series with a series sweep of Oklahoma, their fifth consecutive series sweep.

Postseason

Big 12 Conference tournament
As the Big 12 regular season champion, TCU earned the #1 seed in the 2015 Big 12 Conference baseball tournament. TCU was defeated by the Baylor Bears in their first tournament game and eliminated by the Texas Tech Red Raiders in their second game. The Frogs' 0–2 run in the Big 12 Tournament marked only the second time in Big 12 history that the top-seeded team failed to win a game in the Tournament. The losses also marked the first time TCU lost back-to-back games during the 2015 season.

NCAA Fort Worth Regional
TCU received an at-large bid to the 2015 NCAA Division I baseball tournament and was awarded the #7 National Seed, the second consecutive National Seed and the second in program history. 2015 marked the Horned Frogs' thirteenth NCAA Tournament appearance and their eleventh in twelve seasons. For the fifth time in program history and second consecutive year, TCU was selected as one of the sixteen NCAA Regional tournament hosts. The Horned Frogs were the top-seeded team in the double-elimination regional tournament which also included North Carolina State, Stony Brook and Sacred Heart.

TCU won its Regional opener over Sacred Heart 10–0. The shutout marked the Frogs' 10th of the season. TCU fell into the losers' bracket with a second-game, 4–5 loss to NC State. The Frogs bounced back by sweeping a Sunday doubleheader with an 8–3 win over Stony Brook and an 8–2 win over NC State. The doubleheader sweep forced a decisive final game between TCU and NC State on Monday, June 1. NC State built an 8–1 lead by the top of the 8th inning, but allowed TCU to score 6 unearned runs in the bottom of the frame. TCU tied the game at 8 in the bottom of the 9th and took the game and Regional Tournament Championship in the bottom of the 10th off an RBI single by Elliott Barzilli.

NCAA Fort Worth Super Regional

For the second consecutive year and fifth time in the past seven seasons, the Horned Frogs won an NCAA Regional and advanced to an NCAA Super Regional.

As a top-8 National Seed, the Fort Worth Regional Champions were awarded the right to host Texas A&M, the winner of the College Station Regional, in the 2015 NCAA Fort Worth Super Regional. The winner of the Fort Worth Super Regional will advance to the 2015 College World Series in Omaha, Nebraska. The Super Regional is a best-of-3 series to be played June 6, 7, and 8 (if necessary). June 6, 2015, marked the first time TCU and in-state rival Texas A&M faced off since the 2012 NCAA College Station Regional, in which the Horned Frogs defeated the host Aggies to advance to the 2012 Los Angeles Super Regional.

TCU took game one of the Fort Worth Super Regional, defeating Texas A&M 13–4 in front of a record Lupton Stadium crowd of 7,199. The Aggies bounced back to claim game two, defeating the Frogs 2–1 in front of another record Lupton Stadium crowd of 7,383, forcing a decisive game three. With a 5–4 win in 16 innings, the Horned Frogs clinched the Fort Worth Super Regional Championship and advanced to the 2015 College World Series.

NCAA College World Series
For the third time in program history and second consecutive year, the TCU Horned Frogs, the Big 12 Regular Season Champion, Fort Worth Regional Champion and Fort Worth Super Regional Champion, advanced to the College World Series.

The Horned Frogs opened CWS play against the #2 National Seed and SEC Regular Season Champion LSU Tigers on Sunday, June 14. TCU stunned the Tigers 10–3 to advance into the winners' bracket. The opening CWS win marked the Frogs' 50th win of the season, making 2015 the second 50-win season in TCU history.  The Frogs fell to the defending National Champion Vanderbilt Commodores 1–0 on June 16.  The loss marked the Frogs' first shutout loss in 113 games.  TCU bounced back in a June 18 elimination game with an 8–4 win over LSU to eliminate the Tigers, but the Vanderbilt Commodores again defeated to Frogs on June 19, bring an end to the Horned Frogs' exceptional season.

TCU's final season record for 2015 was 51–15 (18–5 Big 12).

Personnel

Roster

Coaching staff

Schlossnagle Hits Milestones
TCU Head Coach Jim Schlossnagle became only the second head coach in TCU Baseball history to notch a 500th win as TCU's head coach on May 1, 2015, in a 9–4 win at West Virginia. Earlier in the season, the TCU skipper earned his 200th conference win at TCU on April 11, 2015, at Kansas State.

At the conclusion of the 2015 season, Schlossnagle's 516 wins was just one victory shy of tying the all-time TCU head coach win-record set by his predecessor (the former TCU head coach, TCU alum and Southwest Conference Hall of Famer) Lance Brown, who retired in 2003 with 517 wins.

Schedule

! style="background:#4d1979;color:white;"| Regular Season
|- valign="top" 

|- bgcolor="#bbffbb"
| February 13 ||  || #2 || Lupton Stadium • Fort Worth, TX || W 5–0 || Morrison (1–0) || Hauge (0–1) ||  || 4,355 || 1–0 || –
|- bgcolor="#bbffbb"
| February 14 || Southern Illinois || #2 || Lupton Stadium • Fort Worth, TX || W 14–6 || Howard (1–0) || Pruemer (0–1) ||  || 4,164 || 2–0 || –
|- bgcolor="#bbffbb"
| February 15 || Southern Illinois || #2 || Lupton Stadium • Fort Worth, TX || W 11–0 || Young (1–0) || Lesiak (0–1) ||  || 3,275 || 3–0 || –
|- bgcolor="#bbffbb"
| February 17 ||  || #1 || Lupton Stadium • Fort Worth, TX || W 4–1 || Traver (1–0) || Laberge (0–1) ||  || 3,005 || 4–0 || –
|- bgcolor="#bbffbb"
| February 20 || at #9  || #1 || Phoenix Municipal Stadium • Phoenix, AZ || W 3–0 || Morrison (2–0) || Lilek (0–1) ||  || 4,077 || 5–0 || –
|- bgcolor="#ffbbbb"
| February 21 || at #9 Arizona State || #1 || Phoenix Municipal Stadium • Phoenix, AZ || L 6–7 || Kellogg (2–0) || Alexander (0–1) || Burr (3) || 3,559 || 5–1 || –
|- bgcolor="#bbffbb"
| February 22 || at #9 Arizona State || #1 || Phoenix Municipal Stadium • Phoenix, AZ || W 3–2 || Burnett (1–0) || Aboites (0–1) || Ferrell (1) || 3,112 || 6–1 || –
|- bgcolor="#bbffbb"
| February 24 ||  || #1 || Lupton Stadium • Fort Worth, TX || W 1–0 || Traver (2–0) || Gomez (0–2) || Ferrell (2) || 2,788 || 7–1 || –
|-

|- bgcolor="#bbffbb"
| March 3 || #16  || #1 || Lupton Stadium • Fort Worth, TX || W 3–1 || Young (2–0) || Solecitto (0–1) || Ferrell (3) || 3,332 || 8–1 || –
|- bgcolor="#ffbbbb"
| March 6 || at #20  || #1 || Dedeaux Field • Los Angeles, CA || L 6–7 12 || Davis (1–0) || Teakell (0–1) ||  || 1,126 || 8–2 || –
|- bgcolor="#bbffbb"
| March 7 || at #7 UCLA || #1 || Jackie Robinson Stadium • Los Angeles, CA || W 3–1 || Young (3–0) || Watson (2–1) || Ferrell (4) || 1,558 || 9–2 || –
|- bgcolor="#bbffbb"
| March 8 || vs. #4 Vanderbilt || #1 || Dodger Stadium • Los Angeles, CA || W 4–2 || Morrison (3–0) || Pfeifer (1–1) || Ferrell (5) || N/A || 10–2 || –
|- bgcolor="#bbffbb"
| March 10 || at  || #1 || George C. Page Stadium • Los Angeles, CA || W 6–2 || Howard (2–0) || Arriaga (1–1) ||  || 258 || 11–2 || –
|- bgcolor="#bbffbb"
| March 13 || Baylor || #1 || Lupton Stadium • Fort Worth, TX || W 3–1 || Traver (3–0) || Tolson (0–3) || Ferrell (6) || 4,018 || 12–2 || 1–0
|- bgcolor="#bbffbb"
| March 14 || Baylor || #1 || Lupton Stadium • Fort Worth, TX || W 3–2 || Morrison (4–0) || Castano (0–3) || Ferrell (7) || 4,259 || 13–2 || 2–0
|- bgcolor="#bbffbb"
| March 15 || Baylor || #1 || Lupton Stadium • Fort Worth, TX || W 10–1 || Young (4–0) || Stone (0–2) ||  || 4,323 || 14–2 || 3–0
|- bgcolor="#bbffbb"
| March 17 ||  || #1 || Lupton Stadium • Fort Worth, TX || W 5–0 || Howard (3–0) || Gallegos (1–2) ||  || 3,274 || 15–2 || –
|- bgcolor="#bbffbb"
| March 18 || Texas–Pan American || #1 || Lupton Stadium • Fort Worth, TX || W 11–5 || Alexander (1–1) || San Nicolas (0–1) ||  || 3.083 || 16–2 || –
|- bgcolor="#ffbbbb"
| March 20 || #19 Oklahoma State || #1 || Lupton Stadium • Fort Worth, TX || L 6–7 12 || Glover (1–2) || Ferrell (0–1) ||  || 3,738 || 16–3 || 3–1
|- bgcolor="#bbffbb"
| March 21 || #19 Oklahoma State || #1 || Lupton Stadium • Fort Worth, TX || W 7–4 || Morrison (5–0) || Buffett (1–1) ||  || 3,941 || 17–3 || 4–1
|- bgcolor="#ffbbbb"
| March 22 || #19 Oklahoma State || #1 || Lupton Stadium • Fort Worth, TX || L 2–7 || Freeman (4–0) || Young (4–1) ||  || 4,025 || 17–4 || 4–2
|- bgcolor="#bbffbb"
| March 24 || Oklahoma || #4 || Lupton Stadium • Fort Worth, TX || W 4–3 10 || Teakell (1–1) || Neuse (0–1) ||  || 3,696 || 18–4 || –
|- bgcolor="#bbffbb"
| March 27 ||  || #4 || Lupton Stadium • Fort Worth, TX || W 14–1 || Traver (4–0) || Hilliard (0–3) ||  || 3,871 || 19–4 || –
|- bgcolor="#bbffbb"
| March 28 || Wichita State || #4 || Lupton Stadium • Fort Worth, TX || W 8–4 || Morrison (6–0) || Bargfeldt (2–1) ||  || 3,627 || 20–4 || –
|- bgcolor="#bbffbb"
| March 29 || Wichita State || #4 || Lupton Stadium • Fort Worth, TX || W 11–2 || Young (5–1) || Tewes (1–2) ||  || 3,731 || 21–4 || –
|- bgcolor="#ffbbbb"
| March 31 || at Texas–Arlington || #2 || Clay Gould Ballpark • Arlington, TX || L 1–8 || James (2–1) || Alexander (1–2) ||  || 1,201 || 21–5 || –
|-

|- bgcolor="#bbffbb"
| April 2 || at #19 Texas Tech || #2 || Rip Griffin Park • Lubbock, TX || W 8–0 || Traver (5–0) || Moseley (2–3) ||  || 4,393 || 22–5 || 5–2
|- bgcolor="#ffbbbb"
| April 3 || at #19 Texas Tech || #2 || Rip Griffin Park • Lubbock, TX || L 1–5 || Smith (4–2) || Morrison (6–1) ||  || 3,974 || 22–6 || 5–3
|- bgcolor="#bbffbb"
| April 4 || at #19 Texas Tech || #2 || Rip Griffin Park • Lubbock, TX || W 4–1 || Young (6–1) || Damron (2–2) || Ferrell (8) || 4,432 || 23–6 || 6–3
|- bgcolor="#bbffbb"
| April 6 || at  || #6 || Crutcher Scott Field • Abilene, TX || W 4–3 || Trieglaff (1–0) || Altimont (1–5) || Ferrell (9) || 1,588 || 24–6 || –
|- bgcolor="#bbffbb"
| April 7 || #16  || #6 || Lupton Stadium • Fort Worth, TX || W 6–2 || Alexander (2–2) || Fritz (0–1) ||  || 3,702 || 25–6 || –
|- bgcolor="#ffbbbb"
| April 10 || at Kansas State || #6 || Tointon Family Stadium • Manhattan, KS || L 4–14 || Kalmus (1–2) || Traver (5–1) ||  || 3,081 || 25–7 || 6–4
|- bgcolor="#bbffbb"
| April 11 || at Kansas State || #6 || Tointon Family Stadium • Manhattan, KS || W 9–0 || Morrison (7–1) || Courville (0–3) ||  || 2,786 || 26–7 || 7–4
|- bgcolor="#ffbbbb"
| April 12 || at Kansas State || #6 || Tointon Family Stadium • Manhattan, KS || L 2–6 || MaVorhis (2–0) || Young (6–2) ||  || 2,554 || 26–8 || 7–5
|- bgcolor="#bbffbb"
| April 14 || at Texas–Arlington || #8 || Clay Gould Ballpark • Arlington, TX || W 7–1 || Alexander (3–2) || Vassar (2–4) ||  || 664 || 27–8 || –
|- bgcolor="#bbffbb"
| April 18 ||  || #8 || Lupton Stadium • Fort Worth, TX || W 1–0 || Morrison (8–1) || Karalus (1–4) || Ferrell (10) ||  || 28–8 || –
|- bgcolor="#bbffbb"
| April 18 || Santa Clara || #8 || Lupton Stadium • Fort Worth, TX || W 6–1 || Traver (6–1) || Lex (2–4) ||  || 4,871 || 29–8 || –
|- bgcolor="#bbffbb"
| April 19 || Santa Clara || #8 || Lupton Stadium • Fort Worth, TX || W 9–2 || Young (7–2) || Brisentine (2–3) ||  || 3,637 || 30–8 || –
|- bgcolor="#bbffbb"
| April 21 ||  || #7 || Lupton Stadium • Fort Worth, TX || W 6–1 || Howard (4–0) || Looper (1–5) || Guillory (1) || 3,266 || 31–8 || –
|- bgcolor="#bbffbb"
| April 25 || Texas || #7 || Lupton Stadium • Fort Worth, TX || W 6–5 || Morrison (9–1) || French (2–3) || Ferrell (11) || 4,254 || 32–8 || 8–5
|- bgcolor="#bbffbb"
| April 25 || Texas || #7 || Lupton Stadium • Fort Worth, TX || W 11–6 || Trieglaff (2–0) || Culbreth (3–3) ||  || 5,198 || 33–8 || 9–5
|- bgcolor="#bbffbb"
| April 26 || Texas || #7 || Lupton Stadium • Fort Worth, TX || W 7–1 || Young (8–2) || Hollingsworth (3–5) ||  || 4,598 || 34–8 || 10–5
|- bgcolor="#ffbbbb"
| April 29 || at #19 Dallas Baptist || #4 || Horner Ballpark • Dallas, TX || L 4–6 || Fritz (4–1) || Traver (6–2) ||  || 1,274 || 34–9 || –
|-

|- bgcolor="#bbffbb"
| May 1 || at West Virginia || #4 || Monongalia County Ballpark • Granville, WV || W 9–4 || Alexander (4–2) || Myers (2–4) ||  || 2,541 || 35–9 || 11–5
|- bgcolor="#bbffbb"
| May 2 || at West Virginia || #4 || Monongalia County Ballpark • Granville, WV || W 6–2 || Morrison (10–1) || Vance (6–4) ||  || 2,107 || 36–9 || 12–5
|- bgcolor="#bbffbb"
| May 3 || at West Virginia || #4 || Monongalia County Ballpark • Granville, WV || W 5–0 || Young (9–2) || Donato (6–5) ||  || 1,691 || 37–9 || 13–5
|- bgcolor="#bbffbb"
| May 8 || Kansas || #6 || Lupton Stadium • Fort Worth, TX || W 4–2 || Morrison (11–1) || Krauth (7–4) || Ferrell (12) || 3,363 || 38–9 || 14–5
|- bgcolor="#bbffbb"
| May 9 || Kansas || #6 || Lupton Stadium • Fort Worth, TX || W 2–1 || Ferrell (1–1) || Villines (3–4) ||  || 3,686 || 39–9 || 15–5
|- bgcolor="#bbffbb"
| May 12 || Abilene Christian || #5 || Lupton Stadium • Fort Worth, TX || W 8–2 || Traver (7–2) || Hanson (1–3) ||  || 3,634 || 40–9 || –
|- bgcolor="#bbffbb"
| May 14 || at Oklahoma || #5 || L. Dale Mitchell Park • Norman, OK || W 5–4 || Evans (1–0) || Evans, J. (5–1) || Ferrell (13) || 1,113 || 41–9 || 16–5
|- bgcolor="#bbffbb"
| May 15 || at Oklahoma || #5 || L. Dale Mitchell Park • Norman, OK || W 11–9 || Gooch (1–0) || Garza (2–4) || Ferrell (14) || 1,416 || 42–9 || 17–5
|- bgcolor="#bbffbb"
| May 16 || at Oklahoma || #5 || L. Dale Mitchell Park • Norman, OK || W 4–2 || Alexander (5–2) || Handsen (5–6) || Guillory (2) || 1,004 || 43–9 || 18–5
|-

|- 
! style="background:#4d1979;color:white;"| Post-Season
|-

|- bgcolor="#ffbbbb"
| May 20 || Baylor || #4 || ONEOK Field • Tulsa, OK || L 5–6 || Kuntz (1–1) || Ferrell (1–2) ||  || 2,801 || 43–10 || 0–1
|- bgcolor="#ffbbbb"
| May 21 || Texas Tech || #4 || ONEOK Field • Tulsa, OK || L 1–8 || Taylor (4–0) || Morrison (11–2) ||  ||  || 43–11 || 0–2
|-

|- bgcolor="#bbffbb"
| May 29 ||  || #4 || Lupton Stadium • Fort Worth, TX || W 10–0 || Traver (8–2) || Cooksey (7–3) ||  || 3,662 || 44–11 || 1–0 || 1–0
|- bgcolor="#ffbbbb"
| May 30 || NC State || #4 || Lupton Stadium • Fort Worth, TX || L 4–5 || Orwig (2–0) || Ferrell (1–3) ||  || 4,009 || 44–12 || 1–1 || 1–1
|- bgcolor="#bbffbb"
| May 31 ||  || #4 || Lupton Stadium • Fort Worth, TX || W 8–3 || Guillory (1–0) || Rodliff (1–2) ||  || 3,315 || 45–12 || 2–1 || 2–1
|- bgcolor="#bbffbb"
| May 31 || NC State || #4 || Lupton Stadium • Fort Worth, TX || W 8–2 || Alexander (6–2) || Williamson (4–4) ||  || 3,480 || 46–12 || 3–1 || 3–1
|- bgcolor="#bbffbb"
| June 1 || NC State || #4 || Lupton Stadium • Fort Worth, TX || W 9–8 10 || Trieglaff (3–0) || Britt (3–1) ||  || 4,277 || 47–12 || 4–1 || 4–1
|-

|- bgcolor="#bbffbb"
| June 6 || #9  || #4 || Lupton Stadium • Fort Worth, TX || W 13–4 || Teakell (2–1) || Long (9–1) ||  || 7,199 || 48–12 || 5–1 || 1–0
|- bgcolor="#ffbbbb"
| June 7 || #9 Texas A&M || #4 || Lupton Stadium • Fort Worth, TX || L 1–2 10 || Hendrix (6–3) || Morrison (11–3) ||  || 7,383 || 48–13 || 5–2 || 1–1
|- bgcolor="#bbffbb"
| June 8 || #11 Texas A&M || #3 || Lupton Stadium • Fort Worth, TX || W 5–4 16 || Traver (9–2) || Hendrix (6–4) ||  || 7,294 || 49–13 || 6–2 || 2–1
|-

|- bgcolor="#bbffbb"
| June 14 || #1 LSU || #3 || TD Ameritrade Park • Omaha, NE || W 10–3 || Morrison (12–3) || Poche' (9–2) ||  || 24,506 || 50–13 || 7–2 || 1–0
|- bgcolor="#ffbbbb"
| June 16 || #5 Vanderbilt || #3 || TD Ameritrade Park • Omaha, NE || L 0–1 || Pfeifer (6–4) || Young (9–3) || Wright (4) || 24,156 || 50–14 || 7–3 || 1–1
|- bgcolor="#bbffbb"
| June 18 || #1 LSU || #3 || TD Ameritrade Park • Omaha, NE || W 8–4 || Teakell (3–1) || Bain (2–3) ||  || 26,803 || 51–14 || 8–3 || 2–1
|- bgcolor="#ffbbbb"
| June 19 || #5 Vanderbilt || #3 || TD Ameritrade Park • Omaha, NE || L 1–7 || Buehler (5–2) || Alexander (6–3) ||  || 26,011 || 51–15 || 8–4 || 2–2
|-

|-
| style="font-size:88%" | All rankings from Collegiate Baseball.

Rankings

Awards and honors

Tyler Alexander
 NCAA Fort Worth Regional All-Tournament Team
 Honorable Mention All Big 12
 Third Team Preseason All-American (NCBWA)

Nolan Brown
 NCAA Fort Worth Regional All-Tournament Team
 Honorable Mention All Big 12

Garrett Crain
 NCAA Fort Worth Regional All-Tournament Team

Jeremie Fagnan
 Honorable Mention All Big 12

Riley Ferrell
 NCBWA First Team All American
 Louisville Slugger Second Team All-American
 Dick Howser Trophy Award Semifinalist
 NCBHOF National Pitcher of the Year Watch List
 Golden Spikes Award Watch List
 NCBWA Stopper of the Year Watch List
 First Team All Big 12
 Louisville Slugger Pre-season National Player of the Year
 Louisville Slugger Pre-season First team All-American
 Perfect Game USA Pre-season First team All-American
 Baseball America Pre-season First team All-American

Cody Jones
 D1 Baseball Second Team All-American
 NCBWA Third Team All-American
 Baseball America Third Team All-American
 NCAA Fort Worth Regional All-Tournament Team
 Big 12 Player of the Year
 All Big 12 First Team
 Big 12 Hitter of the Week (Mar. 15)

Keaton Jones
 Second Team All Big 12
 Brooks Wallace Award Watch List

Preston Morrison
 Louisville Slugger Second Team All-American
 NCBWA Second Team All-American
 Dick Howser Trophy Award Semifinalist
 NCBWA & Louisville Slugger National Pitcher of the Week (Feb. 23)
 NCBHOF National Pitcher of the Year Watch List
 NCAA Fort Worth Regional All-Tournament Team
 First Team All Big 12
 Big 12 Pitcher of the Week (Feb. 23, Apr. 13)
 Golden Spikes Award Watch List
 Louisville Slugger Pre-season First team All-American
 Perfect Game USA Pre-season Second team All-American

Derek Odell
 NCAA Fort Worth Regional All-Tournament Team
 Honorable Mention All Big 12

Jim Schlossnagle
 Big 12 Coach of the Year

Evan Skoug
 NCAA Fort Worth Regional All-Tournament Team
 Big 12 All-Freshman Team
 Honorable Mention All Big 12

Dane Steinhagen
 Honorable Mention All Big 12

Trey Teakell
 Honorable Mention All Big 12

Mitchell Traver
 Honorable Mention All Big 12
 Golden Spikes Award Watch List

Connor Wanhanen
 Big 12 Freshman of the Year
 First Team All Big 12
 Big 12 All-Freshman Team
 Big 12 Newcomer of the Week (Apr. 20)

Alex Young
 Louisville Slugger Second Team All-American
 NCBWA Third Team All-American
 All Big 12 First Team
 Big 12 Pitcher of the Week (Mar. 9)
 NCBHOF National Pitcher of the Year Watch List

References

TCU Horned Frogs
TCU Horned Frogs baseball seasons
TCU
College World Series seasons